John Symcotts (1592–1662) was a British physician, whose private casebook has been studied to understand typical medical practice in 17th century England. He was sometimes the physician to Oliver Cromwell. An account of his medical career was published in 1951 jointly by William John Bishop and Noël Poynter, in a book entitled A Seventeenth Century Doctor and his Patients: John Symcotts, 1592?–1662.

References 

1592 births
1662 deaths
17th-century English medical doctors